Fugløykalven Lighthouse is a coastal lighthouse in Karlsøy Municipality in Troms og Finnmark county, Norway. The lighthouse is located on the small island Fugløykalven northwest of the island Nord-Fugløya.  This was considered one of the most isolated and difficult assignments of all Norwegian light stations.

History
It was established in 1920 and automated in 2003. The lighthouse is listed as a protected site.

Fugløykalven Lighthouse is an octagonal cylindrical stone tower bearing a large lantern and gallery. The original 2nd order Fresnel lens remains in use; it displays 19 colored sectors, the largest number of any Norwegian light. The lighthouse is painted white and the lantern on top is red.  The lighthouse shines white, red, or green light depending on direction, occulting twice every 8 seconds.

See also

Lighthouses in Norway
List of lighthouses in Norway

References

External links
 Norsk Fyrhistorisk Forening 
 Picture of Fugløykalven Lighthouse

Karlsøy
Lighthouses completed in 1920
Lighthouses in Troms og Finnmark
Listed lighthouses in Norway